Alhama Club de Fútbol, known as Alhama CF ElPozo or Alhama ElPozo for sponsorship reasons and Alhama Females, is a women's association football club base in Alhama de Murcia. Founded in 2004, it currently competes in the Liga F, the Spanish women's football top flight.

History
On 26 January 2022, they defeated Primera División side Eibar in an upset in the Third Round of the Copa de la Reina, Spain's national cup. On 11 February 2022, they were drawn to face Real Madrid in the Round of 16.

Current squad

References

Association football clubs established in 2004
Women's football clubs in Spain
Primera División (women) clubs
2004 establishments in Spain
Football clubs in the Region of Murcia
Segunda Federación (women) clubs